Brandon Davidson (born August 21, 1991) is a Canadian professional ice hockey defenceman who is currently playing with Färjestad BK of the Swedish Hockey League (SHL). He has previously played in the National Hockey League (NHL) for the Buffalo Sabres, San Jose Sharks, Calgary Flames, Chicago Blackhawks, New York Islanders, Montreal Canadiens and Edmonton Oilers, who selected him in the sixth-round, 162nd overall, in the 2010 NHL Entry Draft.

Playing career

Junior
Prior to playing professional hockey, Davidson played junior with the Regina Pats of the Western Hockey League.  Davidson was named the Pats Rookie of the Year after the 2009–10 season. Davidson was selected in the sixth round, 162nd overall by the Edmonton Oilers during the 2010 NHL Entry Draft. In his final season of junior hockey, Davidson served as the Pats captain.

Professional
Davidson signed his first professional contract with the Oilers on May 31, 2012. During his first full professional season with the Oklahoma City Barons of the American Hockey League (AHL), Davidson was diagnosed with testicular cancer after a routine medical exam. He underwent surgery and chemotherapy before being cleared to return to playing hockey.  Davidson started his return to hockey with the Stockton Thunder of the ECHL. He was named the winner of the Fred T. Hunt Memorial Award in 2013, as the AHL player who best exemplifies the qualities of sportsmanship, determination and dedication to hockey.

On February 28, 2017, Davidson was traded by the Oilers to the Montreal Canadiens in exchange for David Desharnais. During the 2017–18 season, Davidson was waived by the Canadiens on December 2, 2017, and was reclaimed by the Oilers on December 3. Davidson recorded his first multi-goal game on January 25, 2018 with two goals against the Calgary Flames, and was also the first time he earned a first star in a game.

On February 24, 2018, Davidson was traded by the Oilers to the New York Islanders in exchange for a 2019 third-round pick. Davidson joined the Islanders for the final stretch of the season, appearing in 15 games and collecting a goal and assist as the club fell short of the post-season.

As an impending restricted free agent, Davidson was not tendered a qualifying offer by the Islanders resulting in his status as a free agent on June 25, 2018. On August 28, 2018, it was announced that Davidson would attend the Chicago Blackhawks' training camp on a professional tryout. On September 27, 2018, the Blackhawks signed Davidson to a one-year contract worth $650,000.  

On July 1, 2019, Davidson signed a one-year, two-way contract with the Calgary Flames. He spent majority of the season with the Flames' American League affiliate, the Stockton Heat. Davidson also skated in seven games for the Flames. On February 24, 2020, he was traded to the San Jose Sharks in exchange for future considerations. Davidson made his Sharks' debut on March 3 in a 5–2 win over the Toronto Maple Leafs. He appeared in only 5 games with the Sharks before the remainder of the regular season was cancelled due to the COVID-19 pandemic.

As a free agent from the Sharks, Davidson continued his journeyman career by agreeing to a one-year, two-way contract with his seventh NHL club, the Buffalo Sabres, on October 9, 2020. He appeared in just 6 games with the Sabres during the pandemic delayed  season, going scoreless.

As a free agent, Davidson opted to remain within the Sabres organization, agreeing to a one-year, two-way contract extension on July 28, 2021.

As a free agent from the Sabres, Davidson elected to continue his career overseas. On August 30, 2022, it was announced that Davidson had signed a two-year deal with Kunlun Red Star of the Kontinental Hockey League. Davidson never appeared with the Red Star, negating his deal and opting to remain in North America and continue his tenure with the Rochester Americans after signing a professional tryout on October 26, 2022 to begin the 2022–23 season. Davidson registered 1 assist through 9 games with the Amerks, before he was released from his PTO on November 28, 2022. On the following day, Davidson continued his tenure in the AHL by immediately signing contract for the remainder of the season with the Cleveland Monsters, the primary affiliate to the Columbus Blue Jackets. 

Davidson made 27 regular season appearances with the Monsters registering 6 points before he ended his contract in order to immediately join his first Swedish club, Färjestad BK of the SHL, on February 15, 2023.

Career statistics

Awards and honours

References

External links

1991 births
Living people
Buffalo Sabres players
Calgary Flames players
Canadian expatriate ice hockey players in the United States
Canadian ice hockey defencemen
Chicago Blackhawks players
Cleveland Monsters players
Edmonton Oilers draft picks
Edmonton Oilers players
Ice hockey people from Alberta
Montreal Canadiens players
New York Islanders players
Oklahoma City Barons players
Olds Grizzlys players
Regina Pats players
Rochester Americans players
Rockford IceHogs (AHL) players
San Jose Sharks players
Sportspeople from Lethbridge
Stockton Heat players
Stockton Thunder players